V.V.Vanniaperumal College for Women, is a women's general degree college located in Virudhunagar, Tamil Nadu. It was established in the year 1962. The college is affiliated with Madurai Kamaraj University. This college offers different courses in arts, commerce and science.

Departments

Science

Physics
Chemistry
Mathematics
Computer Science
Home Science 
Biochemistry
Botany
Zoology

Arts and Commerce

Tamil
English
History
Economics
Commerce

Accreditation
The college is  recognized by the University Grants Commission (UGC).

References

External links
http://vvvcollege.org//

Educational institutions established in 1962
1962 establishments in Madras State
Colleges affiliated to Madurai Kamaraj University
Universities and colleges in Madurai district
Academic institutions formerly affiliated with the University of Madras